Veljko Narančić (26 May 1898 – 6 February 1983) was a Croatian athlete who competed for the Kingdom of Yugoslavia in the 1920s and 1930s. He was a three-time Olympian and appeared at the 1924, 1932 and 1936 Summer Olympics, competing in shot put and discus throw, without winning any medals.

Olympic results

References

1898 births
1983 deaths
Yugoslav male discus throwers
Yugoslav male shot putters
Olympic athletes of Yugoslavia
Athletes (track and field) at the 1924 Summer Olympics
Athletes (track and field) at the 1932 Summer Olympics
Athletes (track and field) at the 1936 Summer Olympics
People from Donji Lapac
People from the Kingdom of Croatia-Slavonia